Gottschalk or Godescalc (Old High German) is a male German name that can be translated literally as "servant of God". Latin forms include Godeschalcus and Godescalcus.

Given name
Godescalc of Benevento, 8th-century Lombard duke
Godescalc, Carolingian scribe; author of the Godescalc Evangelistary
Godescalc of Le Puy, 10th-century bishop, first documented pilgrim of the Via Podiensis
Gottschalk of Orbais, a 9th-century theologian, poet, and unwilling monk, best known as a hero of the Jansenists and for his conflict with Hincmar 
Gottschalk (Slavic prince), 11th-century Slavic Prince of the Wends (Saint Gottschalk)
a 12th-century Holstein peasant, protagonist of the Visio Godeschalci

Surname
Alfred Gottschalk (biochemist) (1894–1973), German biochemist
Alfred Gottschalk (rabbi) (1930–2009), German-born American rabbi
Ben Gottschalk (born 1992), American NFL football player
Carl W. Gottschalk (1922–1997), American professor and kidney researcher
Elisabeth Gottschalk (1912–1989), German-born Dutch historical geographer and professor
Heyno Gottschalk, († 1541), Lutheran monk, the last abbot in Oldenstadt
Jacob C. Gottschalk (c. 1670–c. 1763), American Mennonite bishop
John Gottschalk (born 1943), American newspaper publisher
Joseph Gottschalk (1950–2003), American cycling exhibitionist
Kay Gottschalk (born 1965), German politician
Louis Moreau Gottschalk (1829–1869), American composer and pianist
Louis F. Gottschalk (1864–1934), American composer
Louis A. Gottschalk (1916–2008), American psychiatrist
Marie Gottschalk (born 1958), American political scientist
Robert Gottschalk (1918–1982), American camera technician and founder of Panavision
Timo Gottschalk (born 1974), German rally navigator
Thomas Gottschalk (born 1950), German entertainer and actor
Walter Gottschalk (1918–2004), American mathematician

Other uses
Gottschalks, a former retail chain in the United States
 Gottschalk v. Benson, a 1972 U.S. Supreme Court patent case

See also 
 Gottschall
 Gottschalck
 Godchaux
 Godshall
 Abdullah (name)

German masculine given names
German-language surnames
Jewish surnames